Flavia Álvarez-Pedrosa Pruvost, better known as Flavita Banana (Oviedo, 1987), is a Spanish illustrator and cartoonist.

Biography
She studied Art and Design at the Escola Massana school.

She has collaborated weekly with SModa magazine and monthly with:  Orgullo y satisfacción, El Salto and Mongolia. In 2018 she began collaborating with El País, La maleta de portbou and  Jodtown.

Her cartoons are usually about love and relationships, although in her latest publications, she covers other social issues. With an acid, cynical flavor, a great sense of humor and a great load of sentimentality, Flavita exposes controversial everyday situations.

Work 
 Curvy (Lumen, 2016).
 Las cosas del querer (Lumen, 2017).
 Archivos estelares (¡Caramba!, Astiberri Ediciones, 2017).
 Archivos cósmicos (¡Caramba!, Astiberri Ediciones, 2019).

References 

1987 births
Living people
Spanish comics artists
Spanish comics writers
Spanish female comics artists
Female comics writers
21st-century Spanish women artists
Spanish cartoonists